Singapore was the host of the inaugural 2010 Summer Youth Olympics. It participated in all the 26 sports, with a total of 129 athletes representing the nation.

Medalists
Medals awarded to participants of mixed-NOC (Combined) teams are represented in italics. These medals are not counted towards the individual NOC medal tally.

Singapore medalists:

Archery

The Republic's Abdul Dayyan and Turkey's Begunhan Elif Unsal won the bronze medal playoff in the mixed team event, which was held at the Kallang Field on Thursday. 
Needing a perfect score of 20, they beat Bangladesh's Mohamed Emdadul Haque Milon and Spain's Miriam Alarcón 20–19 in the tie-breaking set. 

Boys

Girls

Mixed Team

Athletics

Boys
Track and Road Events

Girls
Track and Road Events

Badminton

Boys

Basketball

Boys

Girls

Boxing

Boys

Canoeing

Boys

Girls

Cycling

Cross Country

Time Trial

BMX

Road Race

Overall

Diving

Boys

Girls

Equestrian

Fencing

Group Stage

Knock-Out Stage

Field hockey

Football

Gymnastics

Artistic Gymnastics

Boys

Girls

Rhythmic Gymnastics 

Team

Handball

Judo

Individual

Team

Modern pentathlon

Rowing

Sailing

One Person Dinghy

Windsurfing

Shooting

Pistol

Rifle

Swimming

Boys

Girls

Mixed

Table tennis

Individual

Team

Taekwondo

On 16 August 2010, Daryl Tan secured Singapore's first medal at the YOG, winning bronze in the Boys' Under-55 kg taekwondo event at the Suntec International Convention Centre.  Kaveh Rezaei of Iran, the World Junior champion, won 12 – 0.

Suntec International Convention Centre, Tuesday, August 17, 2010 — Shafinas Abdul Rahman secured a bronze — Singapore’s second medal at the Games — after losing her bout to Nguyen Thanh Thao of Vietnam in the women’s 55 kg Taekwondo semi-final.

Tennis

Singles

Doubles

Triathlon

Individual

Mixed

Volleyball

Weightlifting

Wrestling

Freestyle

References

External links

Competitors List: Singapore

2010 in Singaporean sport
Nations at the 2010 Summer Youth Olympics
Singapore at the Youth Olympics